Vulture is an American entertainment news website. It is the standalone pop culture section of New York magazine. Its tagline is "Devouring culture".

History

Vulture debuted in April 2007 as an entertainment blog on NYMag.com, the website of New York magazine. Melissa Maerz and Dan Kois were the founding editors. The initial focus was television and film news, especially recaps of recent TV episodes. Over time, it expanded to publish news and criticism in other areas of high and low culture, such as music, books, comedy, and podcasts.

New York began spinning off Vulture in 2010 when it redesigned the site from its blog format to look more like a "full-fledged" online magazine. Vulture moved to an independent URL, Vulture.com, in February 2012.

The first Vulture Festival, an annual two-day event featuring celebrities from various pop culture fields, took place in New York City in 2014.

Vulture parent company, New York Media, bought the comedy news site Splitsider from the Awl Network and folded its coverage into Vulture in 2018. Vulture became part of Vox Media when New York Media was acquired by Vox in September 2019.

Editors-in-chief
''People who have held the title of editorial director (editor-in-chief)
Josh Wolk (2009–2014)
Gilbert Cruz (2014–2015)
Neil Janowitz (2015–)

References

External links

Internet properties established in 2007
New York (magazine)
Vox Media